Val Verde is a fictional country or city used by Hollywood writer and producer Steven E. de Souza when his stories require a South- or Central-American locale that will not cause legal or diplomatic problems. The location first appeared in his 1985 film Commando.

The name translates as "Green Valley", as "Val" is valley in numerous Latin-based languages (Portuguese, Italian, Spanish, old-fashioned French, Galician and others).

Appearances
A fictional country carrying the name of Val Verde has appeared in a number of films, television programs, and comics by de Souza:
 Commando (1985), Arius (Dan Hedaya) is the former ruler of Val Verde and sends John Matrix (Arnold Schwarzenegger) to kill the current president but he escapes en route. In the movie, the country is an 11-hour flight from Los Angeles International Airport, which places it approximately 5500 miles from California and is likely to be near Chile, Paraguay or Brazil.
 Supercarrier, Episode 5 "Rest and Revolution" (1988) the USS Georgetown commanded by Capt. Henry K. 'Hank' Madigan (Dale Dye) docks in Val Verde just as civil war breaks out.
 Die Hard 2 (1990), General Ramon Esperanza (Franco Nero) is from Val Verde.
 Adventure Inc. (2003), Episode 10 of Season 1 was titled "Plague Ship of Val Verde".
 Sheena (2015). a Devil's Due comic book, is set in Val Verde.

Outside of de Souza's own work, there are other appearances, either linked by shared personnel, or as a direct reference. For example:
 De Souza believes that Predator takes place in Val Verde. Predator, like Commando, was produced by Joel Silver and starred Arnold Schwarzenegger. However, in Predators (2010), Isabelle (Alice Braga) states that the events of the original film took place in Guatemala, though part of the film's first act takes place in another unnamed country. The Predator novelization by Paul Monette also places the events in Guatemala, while Mark Verheiden's comics for Dark Horse specify Colombia.
 Broforce, a 2015 video game, which has characters that parody action heroes like John Matrix from Commando (as well as Dirty Harry, John Rambo, etc.), uses Val Verde as one of its settings.
 Val Verde appears in the anime Symphogear (2012). It is part of the backstory of Chris Yukine, where she lost her parents to war and was captured and enslaved for six years, before being rescued by the United Nations. The fourth season, Symphogear AXZ (2017), features the main characters visiting Val Verde as a key part of the season's plot arc, where Chris recalls her past.
 The film Jurassic Attack (2013) takes place entirely in Val Verde.
 Val Verde appears in the horror film The Theta Girl (2017). In a flashback sequence, the Papa Shogun character recalls discovering a hallucinogenic compound in the slime of an indigenous ground toad found in "this shit-hole country of Val Verde."
 Val Verde appears in the TV show NCIS ("Rendezvous", Season 14, Episode 24, 2017) as a remote part of Paraguay.
 Val Verde is one of the settings of the 2018 film Commando Ninja.
 Part of Hank Green's 2020 novel A Beautifully Foolish Endeavor is set in Val Verde.

Origin

Steven de Souza explained his reason for using Val Verde in his Sheena comic:

Portrayal

Val Verde has principally been used as a plot device or location in place of real Latin American countries in action and adventure movies, as a particular result of  the United States' rocky relations with many nations in the region during the 1980s.

When glimpsed in Commando, it appears to be a poor nation, where subsistence agriculture (i.e. livestock) is side-by-side with military propaganda and constant military presence. Inhabitants appear poor but happy, and there is evidence of a trade embargo reminiscent of that placed on Cuba in the presence of battered but functional vintage 1950s cars.

Locations

As well as studio shots, other locations have been used to portray Val Verde on film:
 The entrance to Long Beach Airport's passenger terminal was used for Val Verde's main airport in Commando.
 San Pedro, California was used for the port of Val Verde on Supercarrier, while Valencia, California stood in for the countryside.
 Puerto Vallarta was used as the principal filming location for Predator, despite the objections of John McTiernan and Donald McAlpine. The early beach shots were taken at Puerto Vallarta and jungle scenes were shot slightly further inland. When more money was released by Fox, McTiernan was able to shoot in his preferred location around Palenque (including the Misol-Ha waterfall) and about half of the final film came from this round of shooting.

Legacy
The spider genus Predatoroonops, named after the spiders' similarity to the Predator himself, has a species named Predatoroonops valverde.

See also
 List of fictional countries
 Banana republic
 555 (telephone number)
 Oceanic Airlines

Notes

Die Hard
Predator (franchise)
Fictional South American countries
Fictional elements introduced in 1985